Iraqi Canadians are Canadians of full or partial Iraqi descent, as well as people from the state of Iraq who are ethno-linguistic and religious minorities. According to the 2011 Census there were 49,680 Canadians of Iraqi ancestry, an increase compared to the 2006 Census.

History
Emigration from Iraq to Canada has increased dramatically due to political and economic situations in Iraq. The Iraq-Iran War resulted in many immigrants. With the destroyed Iraqi economy and the oppression of the 13-year economic sanctions against Iraq that followed the Gulf War of 1990–91, there was all the more reason to emigrate. From 1945 until 1975, fewer than 200 Iraqis arrived in Canada. Emigration substantially increased in 1979, the year Saddam Hussein became president of Iraq. Between 1975 and 1992, 6,472 Iraqis arrived in Canada,  establishing about 3.5 percent of all Arab immigrants in Canada. About 65 percent of Iraqis settled in the province of Quebec, particularly in Montreal, and in the province of British Columbia, particularly in Vancouver on shores of the Pacific Ocean. Many Iraqis also live in the province of Ontario, particularly in the Canadian capital city of Ottawa, Windsor and Toronto, the most populated city in Canada.

The 1991 Canadian census recorded 4,790 Iraqis; 3,525 of wholly Iraqi ancestry, and 1,265 of partial Iraqi ancestry. Iraqi immigrants through the period of 1981-1992 settled principally in a few cities in Canada: British Columbia (362), Alberta (268), Quebec (203), Ontario (176), and Manitoba (152).

Employment
The main causes for the immigration of Iraqis were due to the Gulf War and the situation in Iraq which drove them out of their homeland.

In Canada, Iraqi immigrants seem to face three unexplainable problems, the first being unable to find jobs where they can apply their professional expertise. The second is discrimination, with a possibility that some employers associate them with the regime that they fled. The third is their lack of Canadian experience. Despite a high level of education and professional experience, 54 percent of 892 immigrants were unemployed. Of the 407 with jobs, 40 percent had professional positions; 24 percent, lower white-collar; 30 percent, blue-collar; 3 percent, service; and 3 percent, not stated.

Community life

The patterns of formal association among Iraqis are new and voluntary, as revealed most notably in the Iraqi Community Center based in Cote Des Neiges, Montreal. The center helps Iraqis adapt to Canada and develop ties with general society, and disseminates information about the ethnocultural heritage of Iraqi Canadians. Gender equity is the norm; the president of the Iraqi Canadian Society is a woman.

Culture
Despite differences in dialect, many Iraqi Canadians see themselves as Arabs, Mandaeans, Assyrians or Chaldeans. Almost all Iraqi Arab immigrants wish to maintain the Arabic language in both oral and written forms. Because young children and Canadian-born ones cannot easily learn reading and writing skills, more emphasis is put on teaching oral skills. Many Canadian-born can understand spoken Arabic without being able to speak it.

Gender equity, which has expanded in Iraq itself, is encouraged in Canada. Marriage for both males and females remains principally endogamous.

There are a sizable number of Iraqi Christians in Canada. Christian denominations include Assyrian Church of the East, Chaldean Catholic Church, and Syriac Orthodox Church. The remaining 40 percent are Muslims, either Shiite or Sunni. In contrast to Iraq, where just over half the country’s Muslims are Shiite, among Iraqis in Canada as in the Arab world as a whole, Sunni are by far the majority.

Iraqi population in Canada by province and territory

Notable Iraqi Canadians
 Nhoopeh al-Areebi, professional wrestler (half Iraqi)
 Fajer Al-Kaisi, Iraqi-born Canadian actor and comedian from Montreal
 Joe Balass, filmmaker
 Farouk Kaspaules, Iraqi-born Canadian artist
 Naïm Kattan, author, novelist and critic
 Anisa Mehdi, Emmy Award-winning film director, journalist and director of Inside Mecca
 Duraid Munajim, filmmaker and freelance cinematographer
 Leilah Nadir, writer
 Narcy, rapper
 Farah Nosh, photojournalist
 Muayyed Nureddin, geologist
 Awatef Rasheed, women's rights activist, Femmy Award winner in Canada
 Anita Sarkeesian, feminist media critic and public speaker. Her parents are Armenians from Iraq who emigrated to Canada in the 1970s
 Isho Shiba, Iraqi-Assyrian born in Iraq, and a five-time Canadian national boxing champion
 Isa Hasan al-Yasiri, poet

See also

 Arab Canadians
 Assyrians in Canada
 Kurds in Canada
 Middle Eastern Canadians
 West Asian Canadians

References

 
Ethnic groups in Canada
Arab Canadian
Asian Canadian
 
 
West Asian Canadians